Big Coal: The Dirty Secret Behind America's Energy Future is a book by Jeff Goodell which claims that coal mining is one of America's largest and most influential industries.  Goodell suggests that coal mining is deadly and environmentally destructive.

See also
 Burning the Future: Coal in America
 Green Illusions
 List of books about coal mining
 Mountaintop Removal
 Fossil fuel phase-out

References

External links
"Black Cloud", book review in The New York Times Book Review by Corey S. Powell, June 25, 2006
Books, Articles, Movies, and Websites about Mountaintop Removal Coal Mining

2006 non-fiction books
2006 in the environment
Energy policy of the United States
Books about coal in the United States
Works about the history of mining